Subramanyam Noharathalingam (born 7 June 1963), commonly known as Vino Noharathalingam, is a Sri Lankan Tamil politician and Member of Parliament.

Early life
Noharathalingam was born on 7 June 1963.

Career
Noharathalingam contested the 2000 parliamentary election as one of the Tamil Eelam Liberation Organization (TELO)'s candidates in Vanni District and was elected to the Parliament. On 20 October 2001 the All Ceylon Tamil Congress, Eelam People's Revolutionary Liberation Front, TELO and Tamil United Liberation Front formed the Tamil National Alliance (TNA). Noharathalingam contested the 2001 parliamentary election as one of the TNA's candidates in Vanni District but failed to get re-elected.

Noharathalingam contested the 2004 parliamentary election as one of the TNA's candidates in Vanni District and was re-elected to Parliament. He was re-elected at the 2010 parliamentary election. He contested the 2015 parliamentary election as one of the TNA's candidates in Vanni District but failed to get elected after coming 6th amongst the TNA candidates.

Noharathalingam contested the 2020 parliamentary election as a TNA candidate in Vanni District and was re-elected to Parliament.

Electoral history

References

1963 births
Living people
Members of the 11th Parliament of Sri Lanka
Members of the 13th Parliament of Sri Lanka
Members of the 14th Parliament of Sri Lanka
Members of the 16th Parliament of Sri Lanka
People from Northern Province, Sri Lanka
Sri Lankan Hindus
Sri Lankan Tamil politicians
Sri Lankan Tamil rebels
Tamil Eelam Liberation Organization politicians
Tamil National Alliance politicians